The Chicago and North Western Office Building/Passenger Depot-Lake City, also known as the Lake City Depot, is a historic building located in Lake City, Iowa, United States.  The Toledo & North Western Railroad (TNW) laid the first tracks through town in 1881–1882.  Because Lake City was already established, they built a two-story, frame, combination depot and the southeast edge of town.  Because of its convenient location, the TNW also built their repair and maintenance shops in Lake City in the 1880s.  They placed their division headquarters here in 1887.  The Chicago and North Western Railway (CNW) acquired controlling interest in the TNW in June 1881, and ran it separately until it formally acquired it in 1890.

The CNW announced in 1899 that were going to build a new office building in Lake City, and they completed the classically influenced, 2½-story brick building the following year.  In 1916 the railroad announced that they were moving their divisional headquarters to Sioux City, and they would convert their office building in Lake City into a depot.  The shops remained in town until 1924, when they were closed.  The CNW discontinued passenger service after World War II.  A freight agent remained at the depot until 1969 when the station closed.  The CNW abandoned its line through Lake City in 1972.  The building was listed on the National Register of Historic Places in 1990.

References

Office buildings completed in 1900
Railway stations in the United States opened in 1916
Railway stations closed in 1969
1916 establishments in Iowa
1969 disestablishments in Iowa
Lake City, Iowa
Transportation buildings and structures in Calhoun County, Iowa
Railway stations on the National Register of Historic Places in Iowa
Former railway stations in Iowa
Lake City
National Register of Historic Places in Calhoun County, Iowa